Brian Joseph Chesky (born August 29, 1981) is an American businessman and industrial designer. He is the co-founder and CEO of the peer-to-peer lodging service Airbnb. Chesky was named one of Time "100 Most Influential People of 2015".

Early life and education
Brian Chesky was born on August 29, 1981, in Niskayuna, New York, the son of Deborah and Robert H. Chesky; His father is of Polish descent and his mother of Italian origin. Chesky's parents were both social workers. He has a younger sister, Allison. As a child, Chesky was interested in art, drawing replicas of paintings, and design, redesigning shoes and toys. He later became interested in landscape architecture and design.

In 1999, Chesky started attending the Rhode Island School of Design (RISD). He received his Bachelor of Fine Arts in industrial design in 2004. During his time at RISD, Chesky met Joe Gebbia, who would later be one of the co-founders of Airbnb.

Career
After attending college, Chesky worked as an industrial designer and strategist at 3DID, Inc. in Los Angeles. In 2007, he moved to San Francisco where he shared an apartment with Gebbia. In October 2007, the Industrial Designers Society of America was hosting a conference in San Francisco and all hotel rooms were booked. The pair could not afford rent for the month and decided to rent their apartment for money. They purchased three air mattresses and marketed this idea as "Airbed and Breakfast", with three guests staying the first night.

In February 2008, Harvard graduate and technical architect Nathan Blecharczyk became the third co-founder of Airbnb. Each co-founder assumed a role within the new company, with Chesky becoming the leader and chief executive officer. To receive funding, Chesky and his co-founders created special-edition cereals called "Obama O's" and "Cap'n McCains", based on presidential candidates Barack Obama and John McCain. Impressed by the cereal boxes, Y Combinator accepted Airbnb into its seed funding program. In its first year, the company began internationalizing and opened several offices in Europe. In 2011, Chesky wrote a letter on behalf of the company for its handling of a resident complaint about tenant vandalism by announcing a 24-hour hotline, additional staff support and a guarantee for theft or vandalism. In 2015, Chesky announced that Airbnb was an official sponsor of the 2016 Summer Olympics in Rio de Janeiro, Brazil. He said that more than 120,000 people had stayed in Airbnb homes during the 2014 FIFA World Cup. As of December 2020, Airbnb went public at a $100 billion valuation.

Chesky told Kara Swisher's Recode Decode podcast that he has a "standing regular checkin" phone call with former U.S. President Barack Obama.

Philanthropy
On June 11, 2016, Chesky joined Warren Buffett and Bill Gates' 'The Giving Pledge', a group of billionaires who have committed to give the majority of their wealth away.

In May 2022, The Obama Foundation announced a $100 million gift from Airbnb co-founder and CEO Brian Chesky. The gift was to launch a new scholarship program for students pursuing careers in public services. The Voyager Scholarship aka The Obama-Chesky Scholarship for Public Service aims to support students in their junior and senior years of college with up to 50,000 in financial aid, a $10,000 stipend and free Airbnb housing to pursue a summer work-travel experience between their junior and senior years of college; a $2,000 travel credit every year for 10 years following graduation; an annual summit; and a network of mentors.

Recognition

In 2015, Chesky was included on the Forbes list of America's Richest Entrepreneurs Under 40. Chesky was recognized on Times magazine's 100 Most Influential People for 2015.

In May 2015, President Obama named Chesky an Ambassador of Global Entrepreneurship.

In 2016, he was also named in the Youngest Forbes 400 list.

In 2018, Chesky was named the Bay Area Executive of the Year by Business Times.

In  June 2022, he was featured among the 100 Most Powerful People in Global Hospitality by the International Hospitality Institute.

Personal life
Chesky was previously in a relationship with artist Elissa Patel.

References

1981 births
Living people
People from Niskayuna, New York
Rhode Island School of Design alumni
American billionaires
American chief executives of travel and tourism industry companies
American company founders
American people of Italian descent
American people of Polish descent
Chief executives in the hospitality industry
Giving Pledgers
21st-century philanthropists
Y Combinator people